Up from the Ranks is a 19-minute 1943 Canadian docudrama film, made by the National Film Board of Canada (NFB) as part of the wartime Canada Carries On series. The film, directed by Julian Roffman and produced by Raymond Spottiswoode, described the training of Canadian Army officers to take on command responsibilities during the Second World War.

Synopsis
In 1943, a group of Canadian Army officer recruits begin their 90-day training regimen at the Canadian Officers' Training Centre (OTC) at Brockville, Ontario. The object is to turn out officers who will take charge of a platoon of soldiers. The way officers once received their commission through family connections or other status, is no longer being followed as the recruits are not college graduates, just ordinary soldiers who have proven themselves in the enlisted ranks, and already serving in overseas units.

Their first day involves receiving all the manuals, weapons and equipment and finding a bed in the barracks, shared by three or four men. As the recruits settle in, they share their experiences on course, and counsel each other as to what is required. Lectures conducted by experienced leaders stress that an officer must learn not only the basics but has to communicate with his men. Understanding what leadership means is more than just "book learning" but also being able to relate to those who under his command with a sense of humility and honesty, and even, humour.

The gruelling training was to prepare officer candidates to face "the toughest enemy on earth.” In describing the training, one candidate relates, "I think that any officer who can't run faster and farther and fight better than any man that he's supposed to be leading isn't worthy of leading those men across the road." All officer candidates learn to use weapons, drive trucks and motorcycles across rough terrain and tackle obstacle courses during field exercises. Hand-to-hand combat is also taught so that an enemy can be subdued in a lethal manner.

When the course was completed, at a graduation ceremony, the new officers received their commission from Brigadier Milton Gregg VC, who had been instrumental in setting up the Officers' Training Centre at Brockville.

Cast

 Lieut. Pete Coventry
 Lieut. Roily Ashman
 Lieut. Bill Connelly
 Lieut. Paul Richard
 Lieut. Marc Talbot
 Lieut. John Taylor
 Lieut. Harry Mar
 Lieut. Bill Tichnor
 Lieut. Smith
 Lieut. Roger Monast
 Brigadier Milton Gregg

Production
Typical of the NFB's Second World War documentary short films in the Canada Carries On series, Up from the Ranks was made in cooperation with the Director of Public Information, Herbert Lash. The film was created as a morale boosting propaganda film with another purpose, to show how officer training produced future leaders in the Canadian Army.

Up from the Ranks, although using some compilation documentary techniques incorporating newsreel material in the initial scenes, was a docudrama that relied heavily on original footage shot at a military base in Canada, using officers-in-training who were the "actors". Director Julian Roffman was able to cast a number of trainees who would provide a realistic if "wooden" performance as officers. The "stars" of Up from the Ranks were identified in a contemporary review of the film, that appeared in the September 3, 1943 issue of the Winnipeg Tribune:  "Stars of 'Up From the Ranks' are mostly youthful commissioned officers who came to Canada as sergeants. There Is Lieut. Roily Ashman, a woodmlll worker near Ottawa; Lieut. Bill Connelly, who did a little radio singing in Ottawa and worked as a salesman; Lieut. John Taylor was a bank clerk; Lieut. Smith, a mechanic; Lieut. Paul Richard, a radio station manager in Quebec; Lieut. Marc Talbot was a foreman of a paper mill; Lieut. Harry Mar - sales, cafe proprietor from the United States, and Lieut. Bill Tichnor was a Ford mechanic. Roger Monast, the French lad in the film, was a stunt flier in 'Captains of the Clouds'. He was washed out of the R.C.A.F. after a crash."

Reception
Up from the Ranks was produced in 35 mm for the theatrical market, bit was also destined for showings to a military audience. Each film was shown over a six-month period as part of the shorts or newsreel segments in approximately 800 theatres across Canada. The NFB had an arrangement with Famous Players theatres to ensure that Canadians from coast-to-coast could see them, with further distribution by Columbia Pictures.

After the six-month theatrical tour ended, individual films were made available on 16 mm to schools, libraries, churches and factories, extending the life of these films for another year or two. They were also made available to film libraries operated by university and provincial authorities. A total of 199 films were produced before the series was canceled in 1959.

See also
 Letter from Aldershot (1940), a NFB documentary on soldiers First Division of the Canadian Active Service Force, stationed at Aldershot Garrison, England in the Second World War.
 Letter from Camp Borden (1941), a NFB documentary on the soldiers training at the Canadian Army's Camp Borden during wartime.

References

Notes

Citations

Bibliography

 Ellis, Jack C. and Betsy A. McLane. New History of Documentary Film. London: Continuum International Publishing Group, 2005. .
 Lerner, Loren. Canadian Film and Video: A Bibliography and Guide to the Literature. Toronto: University of Toronto Press, 1997. .

External links
 Up from the Ranks at NFB Collections website
 Watch Up from the Ranks at NFB,ca

1943 films
Canadian black-and-white films
Canadian short documentary films
Canadian World War II propaganda films
National Film Board of Canada documentaries
1943 documentary films
Canadian docudrama films
Films set in Ontario
Films shot in Ontario
Brockville
Canada Carries On
Quebec films
Columbia Pictures short films
1940s English-language films
Films directed by Julian Roffman
Canadian drama short films
1940s Canadian films